Chilina iguazuensis is a species of air-breathing freshwater snail, an aquatic pulmonate gastropod mollusk in the family Chilinidae.

The specific name iguazuensis is derived from the Iguazu River, where it lives.

Distribution 
Chilina iguazuensis is endemic to Iguazú National Park, Misiones Province, Argentina. It lives in the Upper Iguazú River there.

Ecology 
This snail species lives in the rapids of Upper Iguazú River.

References

External links 

Chilinidae
Gastropods described in 2008